Thiosulfate (IUPAC-recommended spelling; sometimes thiosulphate in British English) is an oxyanion of sulfur with the chemical formula . Thiosulfate also refers to the compounds containing this anion, which are the salts of thiosulfuric acid, e.g. sodium thiosulfate . Thiosulfate also refers to the esters of thiosulfuric acid, e.g. O,S-dimethyl thiosulfate . The prefix thio- indicates that the thiosulfate is a sulfate with one oxygen replaced by sulfur. Thiosulfate is tetrahedral at the central S atom. Thiosulfate salts occur naturally. Thiosulfate ion has C3v symmetry, and is produced by certain biochemical processes. It rapidly dechlorinates water and is notable for its use to halt bleaching in the paper-making industry. Thiosulfate salts are mainly used in dying in textiles and the bleaching of natural substances.

Sodium thiosulfate, commonly called hypo (from "hyposulfite"), was widely used in photography to fix black and white negatives and prints after the developing stage; modern 'rapid' fixers use ammonium thiosulfate as a fixing salt because it acts three to four times faster. Some bacteria can metabolise thiosulfates.

Formation
Thiosulfate ion is produced by the reaction of sulfite ion with elemental sulfur, and by incomplete oxidation of sulfides (e.g. pyrite oxidation). Sodium thiosulfate can be formed by disproportionation of sulfur dissolving in sodium hydroxide (similar to phosphorus).

Reactions

Thiosulfate ions are stable only in neutral or alkaline solutions, but not in acidic solutions, due to disproportionation to sulfite ions and sulfur, the sulfite ions being dehydrated to sulfur dioxide:

This reaction may be used to generate an aqueous suspension of sulfur and demonstrate the Rayleigh scattering of light in physics. If white light is shone from below, blue light is seen from sideways and orange light from above, due to the same mechanisms that color the sky at midday and dusk.

Thiosulfate ions react with iodine to give tetrathionate ions:

This reaction is key for iodometry.
With bromine (X = Br) and chlorine (X = Cl), thiosulfate ions are oxidized to sulfate ions:

Reactions with metals and metal ions

Thiosulfate ion extensively forms diverse complexes with transition metals. In the era of silver-based photography, thiosulfate ion was consumed on a large scale as a "fixer" reagent. This application exploits thiosulfate ion's ability to dissolve silver halides. Thiosulfate ion (as sodium thiosulfate) is also used to extract or leach gold and silver from their ores as a less toxic alternative to cyanide ion.

Also reflecting its affinity for metals, thiosulfate ion rapid corrodes metals in acidic conditions. Steel and stainless steel are particularly sensitive to pitting corrosion induced by thiosulfate ions. Molybdenum improves the resistance of stainless steel toward pitting (AISI 316L hMo). In alkaline aqueous conditions and medium temperature (60 °C), carbon steel and stainless steel (AISI 304L, 316L) are not attacked, even at high concentration of base (30%w KOH), thiosulfate ion (10%w) and in presence of fluoride ion (5%w KF).

Occurrence
The very rare mineral sidpietersite, as the presence of this anion in the mineral bazhenovite was recently disputed.

Nomenclature
Thiosulfate is an acceptable common name (but used almost always); functional replacement IUPAC name is sulfurothioate; the systematic additive IUPAC name is trioxidosulfidosulfate(2−) or trioxido-1κ3O-disulfate(S—S)(2−). The external sulfur atom has a valence of 2 while the central sulfur atom has a valence of 6. The oxygen atoms have a valence of 2.

Biochemistry
The enzyme rhodanase (thiosulfate sulfurtransferase) catalyzes the detoxification of cyanide ion by thiosulfate ion by transforming them into thiocyanate ion and sulfite ion:

Sodium thiosulfate has been considered as an empirical treatment for cyanide poisoning, along with hydroxocobalamin. It is most effective in a pre-hospital setting, since immediate administration by emergency personnel is necessary to reverse rapid intracellular hypoxia caused by the inhibition of cellular respiration, at complex IV.

It activates thiosulfate sulfurtransferase (TST) in mitochondria. TST is associated with protection against obesity and type II (insulin resistant) diabetes.

References

External links
 Thiosulfate ion General Chemistry Online, Frostburg State University

Corrosion
Corrosive substances
Sulfur oxyanions